Antonio Pavlov (born 2 September 1988) is a Bulgarian footballer, who plays as a forward.

Career
A product of the Levski Sofia youth system, Pavlov spent some years on loans at smaller teams as Sportist Svoge, Kaliakra Kavarna and Chavdar Byala Slatina.

On 26 July 2011, he joined Hapoel Jerusalem on a one-year deal. On 29 September 2012, Pavlov scored a last-minute goal against his youth club Levski Sofia to level the score at 1:1 in an A PFG match.

References

External links

1988 births
Living people
Bulgarian footballers
Association football forwards
PFC Levski Sofia players
FC Sportist Svoge players
PFC Kaliakra Kavarna players
PFC Vidima-Rakovski Sevlievo players
PFC Slavia Sofia players
PFC Ludogorets Razgrad players
Hapoel Jerusalem F.C. players
FC Lokomotiv 1929 Sofia players
Maccabi Yavne F.C. players
FC Septemvri Sofia players
First Professional Football League (Bulgaria) players
Liga Leumit players
Bulgarian expatriate footballers
Expatriate footballers in Israel
Bulgarian expatriate sportspeople in Israel